Nicholas Sautner (born 19 June 1977) is an Australian rules footballer, best known for his Victorian Football League (VFL) football career with the Sandringham Zebras. He also played for Frankston in 2001 and 2002 and Preston in 2003.

He won the Jim 'Frosty' Miller Medal for leading goalkicker in the VFL a record nine times, breaking the record held by the eponymous Jim 'Frosty' Miller of six. He was league leading goalkicker a record six years in a row from 1999 to 2004, breaking the record of four in a row held by George Taylor (1920–1923) and Miller (1968–1971), and won the award nine times in eleven years from 1999 to 2009.

Career overview
Sautner began his VFL career in 1996 with the Springvale Football Club, playing as a defender, but he never managed a senior game for Springvale. He moved to Sandringham in 1997, where he played in a premiership side in 1997. Two years later, Sautner kicked 89 goals and won the inaugural Jim "Frosty" Miller Medal as the competition's leading goalkicker.

The 2000 season saw the VFL become affiliated with the professional Australian Football League, and saw Sandringham affiliated with the Melbourne Football Club. Sautner kicked 70 goals and won the Frosty Miller Medal again as part of the Zebras' premiership team.

Sautner switched teams in 2001 when he moved to bayside rival Frankston and again in 2003 when he was lured to the Northern Bullants. He played a total of 58 games with those clubs, and he was the league's leading goalkicker again in all three seasons, including his career-best 93 goals in the 2002 season with Frankston.

He returned to Sandringham in 2004 and won the Frosty Miller medal for the sixth consecutive time, a VFL record, as well as winning a third premiership with the Zebras. In the following two seasons, Sautner won two more premierships, bringing his total to five (a Sandringham record), but his streak of Frosty Miller medals was broken by James Podsiadly in 2005.

Between 2007 and 2009, Sautner won another three Frosty Miller Medals, bringing his total to nine, a VFA/VFL record as of 2022.

Sautner announced his retirement from VFL football in January 2011. Sautner played with Collegians in the Victorian Amateur Football Association in 2011 and 2012, winning premierships in both seasons.

Post-football career
After retiring from football, Sautner has held numerous sports administration positions. In June 2016, Sautner was announced as the General Manager Commercial at Eden Park, New Zealand.

References

External links
Sautner announces VFL Retirement
Personal Website

1977 births
Sandringham Football Club players
Frankston Football Club players
Preston Football Club (VFA) players
Collegians Football Club players
Living people
Australian rules footballers from Victoria (Australia)